Alireza Rahimi may refer to:

Alireza Rahimi (footballer)
Alireza Rahimi (politician)